Jorge Nicolás Mazzina (born 31 January 1979), known as Nicolás Mazzina, is an Argentine footballer who plays as a midfielder.

Career
Born in Buenos Aires, Argentina, Mazzina made his way through the youth system at Boca Juniors, but after failing to make it into the first team he joined Kimberley in August 2000. After playing 29 games and scoring eight goals for the side, he joined Welsh side Swansea City in July 2001 after playing for them on trial. He was later told he was allowed to leave the club and in December he joined Motherwell of the Scottish Premier League on a one-week trial. He later had trials with Walsal and Livingston. He was released by Swansea in February 2002 after making four appearances for the club.

He went on trial with York City during pre-season in 2002, and despite picking up an injury was signed on by the club in August. His short-term contract was extended for a further month in September, but was released in October after making three appearances for the side. He resumed his career in regional Spanish football after joining Parador in 2004, and here he made 45 appearances and scored five goals in all competitions in five seasons. He then spent the 2009–10 season with Las Norias, where he made seven appearances.

Career statistics

Footnotes

A.  The "League" column constitutes appearances and goals (including those as a substitute) in the Football League and Divisiones Regionales de Fútbol in Andalusia.
B.  The "Other" column constitutes appearances and goals (including those as a substitute) in the play-offs.

References

External links

1979 births
Living people
Footballers from Buenos Aires
Argentine footballers
Argentine expatriate footballers
Association football midfielders
Boca Juniors footballers
Swansea City A.F.C. players
York City F.C. players
English Football League players
Expatriate footballers in England
Argentine expatriate sportspeople in England
Argentine expatriate sportspeople in Wales
Expatriate footballers in Wales